Bellefire were an Irish girl group, best known for their 2002 cover of the U2 song "All I Want Is You". The original line-up consisted of Kelly Kilfeather (born 23 March 1979), Tara Lee (born 25 July 1982), Cathy Newell (born 14 July 1982) and Ciara Newell (born 7 July 1983). Tara Lee left the group in 2002. They mostly performed pop and adult contemporary music. Outside Southeast Asia and their native Ireland, they have received minimal recognition, although they did experience minor success in the United Kingdom with their singles.

History
They first formed in 1999 (see 1999 in music), at an audition organised by Louis Walsh and John Reynolds, the management team behind Boyzone. Walsh and Reynolds' goal was to form a male/female mixed group. According to the Irish Independent, Walsh was disappointed with the standard of male entrants and opted to sign a girl group instead. The intention was to aim towards "a more mature niche in the pop market" than what was becoming the norm for vocal groups at the time. The line-up was chosen with the inclusion of a fifth member called Paula O'Neill. They performed for the first time under the name 'Chit Chat' as a support act to Boyzone's Point Depot concerts in January 2000, soon after which Paula O'Neill left the group. The four remaining members went on to sign a recording contract with Virgin Records as 'Bellefire' later that year. 

After recording their debut album After the Rain, they released two singles, both of which were top twenty hits in the UK. Their first single, "Perfect Bliss" reached No.2 in the Irish charts and went double platinum in their home country. It started to pick up high levels of airplay in Japan, so the girls delayed release of the album in the UK to concentrate on the Japanese market. Perfect Bliss reached No.1 in the Japanese international music charts and meant three months of touring and promotion in Asia and the release of their album After The Rain, especially for the Japanese market. They collaborated with Japanese artist Hitomi Yaida; re-writing English lyrics for Yaida's hit song Buzzstyle, which they recorded in their own harmonised sound and they performed this with her on Japanese TV and in a televised concert.

Their second single "All I Want Is You" was released almost a year after their first single in the UK. It received a lot of airplay and got them an appearance on Top of the Pops. However, just as the album and another single were due for release, their record company Virgin unexpectedly dropped them and European version of their album was never released. Changes at Virgin meant new management at the label who had not worked with the band before, decided that Bellefire along with many other artists on the label were to be dropped. 
A disillusioned Tara left to become a fashion student, while the other three girls continued as a three-piece.  The girls UK version of their debut album was shelved and has never been made available to the public. Several new songs were recorded such as 'Got Me by the Heart', 'Light My Fire', 'Turnaround' and 'I Hope You Dance'. The track Turnaround was given to Westlife and became the title track to one of their albums.  They were signed by WEA in 2003 and moved their base to London. They subsequently recorded a new album entitled Spin the Wheel.

Their first single as a trio was "Say Something Anyway", which peaked in the UK at No.26, but spent only three weeks on the charts. It peaked in Ireland at No. 2 and repeated previous success by going double platinum. The planned follow-up single for the summer of 2004, "You Were Meant for Me", was shelved. Bellefire spent the summer of 2004 promoting their upcoming single and album release around the UK at various festivals, but due to the album and single being continually pushed back, the summer promotion did little to boost their reputation and sales. After the failure of their next single, the title track "Spin the Wheel" to impact the UK charts in October 2004, Bellefire once again concentrated on the Asian market, where "Say Something Anyway" was reaching the top of the charts in countries such as Thailand, Malaysia, Indonesia and The Philippines. They completed their tour of Southeast Asia and released their album there. The UK release of the Spin the Wheel album and a third single was pushed back several times until it was eventually cancelled.

After the non-release of the "Spin the Wheel" album in the UK, Bellefire and Atlantic Records parted company, and the group went their separate ways.

Ciara Newell was credited as a backing vocalist for Blue member Lee Ryan's solo album in 2005, and also performed on the soundtrack for RTÉ drama, Showbands.  In 2010, she was involved with the Irish language television station, TG4, where she worked as a judge on the 4th series of its flagship talent show, Glas Vegas.  The series began airing on TG4 in early 2010. Ciara now works at Universal Music Group in London as a Song plugger.

Cathy Newell was a judge on the 2005 Irish television show Star Stream Final, and is currently registered as a commercial model at Dublin agency Morgan

Kelly Kilfeather began working with independent studio Little Tardis but no material ever materialised from these sessions.

Paula O'Neill, who departed the group before they became known as Bellefire, is now a wedding singer.  She appeared as a contestant on episode five of the third series of reality talent show The Voice of Ireland which aired on 2 February 2014.  Paula performed a Pink song Who Knew in front of judges, Dolores O'Riordan, Kian Egan, Jamelia and Bressie.  However none of the 4 judges turned their chair for her.

In January 2017, 3 tracks from the band's unreleased debut album were leaked onto the Internet.

Discography

Albums

Singles

Notes
A Song was exclusively released in Japan only.
B European release of the song was cancelled, but it was released in Asia.

Unreleased songs
A list of known unreleased songs
 "Got Me by the Heart"
 "I Hope You Dance"
 "Turnaround"
 "Light My Fire"
 "Don't Leave The Light On"
 "For You" (rumour)

References

External links
Bellefire Forum: The Bellefire Message Board at bellefiremusic.com

Bellefire Forever: Biography
Ciara Newell, New Judge on 4th Season of Glas Vegas

Band members links

Tara Fashion Spotlight

Musical groups established in 1999
Musical groups disestablished in 2004
Irish pop music groups
Irish girl groups
Musical groups from County Galway
1999 establishments in Ireland